Casablanca Beats is a 2021 Moroccan drama film directed by Nabil Ayouch. In June 2021, the film was selected to compete for the Palme d'Or at the 2021 Cannes Film Festival. The film was produced by Ali n’ Productions. It is reportedly the first Moroccan film to be selected to compete for the Palme d'Or since 1962. The film was shot at Les Etoiles de Sidi Moumen, a cultural centre that director Ayouch co-founded with Mahi Binebine in 2014. It was selected as the Moroccan entry for the Best International Feature Film at the 94th Academy Awards.

Plot
In Sidi Moumen, a group of talented teens aspire to put on a rap concert.

Cast
 Ismail Adouab as Ismail
 Nouhaila Arif as Nouhaila
 Samah Barigou as Samah
 Abdelilah Basbousi as Abdou
 Anas Basbousi as Anas

See also
 List of submissions to the 94th Academy Awards for Best International Feature Film
 List of Moroccan submissions for the Academy Award for Best International Feature Film

References

External links
 

2021 films
2021 drama films
Moroccan drama films
Films directed by Nabil Ayouch
2020s French films
2020s hip hop films
Films set in Casablanca